Breast carcinoma amplified sequence 3, also known as BCAS3, is a protein which in humans is encoded by the BCAS3 gene. BCAS3 is a gene that is amplified and overexpressed in breast cancer cells.

Function 

The BCAS3 gene is regulated by estrogen receptor alpha (ER-α).  The PELP1 protein acts as a transcriptional coactivator of estrogen receptor induced BCAS3 gene expression.  In addition BCAS3 possesses histone acetyltransferase activity and itself appears to act as a coactivator of ER-α. Furthermore, BCAS3 requires PELP1 to function as a coactivator in ER-α. Hence BCAS3 apparently is involved in a positive feedback loop leading to ER-α mediated signal amplification.

References

External links

Further reading